Jaipur Pink Panthers (JPP) is a professional kabaddi team which belongs to Pink City of India Jaipur, competes in Pro Kabaddi League which is a professional Kabaddi league in India. The team is currently led by Sunil Kumar Malik and coached by Sanjeev Baliyan. The team is owned by Abhishek Bachchan. Jaipur Pink Panthers play their home matches at Sawai Mansingh Indoor Stadium.

Although the team has gained immense popularity due to its association with celebrity owners, Jaipur Pink Panthers won inaugural season of Pro Kabaddi League 2014 by defeating U Mumba by 35-24. The team's performance however then dropped in PKL Season 2 and Season 3 but improved from the  season 4 as it qualified for the playoffs and finishing as a runners up in the final against Patna pirates. The leading raider of the side was Jasvir Singh, while the leading defender was Ran Singh. Jaipur Pink Panthers are exclusively managed by GS Entertainment Worldwide which is headed by Mr. Bunty Walia, one of the leading film producers and Sports Entrepreneur and Mr Juspreet Singh Walia. 
On 4 December 2020 Amazon prime video released Sons of the Soil, a docu-series based on Jaipur pink panthers and their journey in Season 7 of Pro kabaddi league.On 17 December 2022 Jaipur Pink Panthers beat Puneri Paltan 33-29 in the final to become the 2nd team after Patna Pirates to win more than 1 title of the Pro Kabaddi League with this win Panthers hold their 2nd pkl title after 8 years.The panthers also made some memorable records as their Arjun deshwal becomes the Most Valuable Player of the season and Ankush hold the record for most tackle point (89) in the ninth season.

Team identity
The official theme of the team is ‘Roar for Panthers’ and the official colours are pink and blue.

Logo
In the inaugural season, Their logo had an illustration of the muscular pink panther with cool smiling face. In 2015, minor changes in logo was happened. Pink panther's position was changed and the perspective of the text was also changed.

This team is reference to the Friz Freleng cartoon character Pink Panther.

Current squad

Seasons

Season I

Jaipur finished first in the league stage and won the championship beating U Mumba in the finals.

Season II

This season Jaipur Pink Panthers finished the league at the 5th position.

Season III

Season IV

Jaipur Pink Panther finished Runner-up in the Fourth season.

Season V

Season VI

Season VII

Season VIII

Season IX

Records

Overall results Pro Kabbaddi Seasons

By opposition
''Note: Table lists in alphabetical order.

Sponsors

References 

Pro Kabaddi League teams
Sport in Jaipur
2014 establishments in Rajasthan
Kabaddi clubs established in 2014